Spanish Dance Troupe is the sixth album by Welsh psychedelic folk band Gorky's Zygotic Mynci, released on 4 October 1999. The album was recorded at Stiwdio Ofn in Llanfaelog, Anglesey and mastered by Chris Blair at Abbey Road Studios. The album was the last to feature founder member John Lawrence, who had departed the band by the time the album was released.

The title track was covered by Of Montreal and appeared as a bonus track on their 2004 album Satanic Panic in the Attic.

Track listing
All songs by Euros Childs unless otherwise stated.

"Hallway"
"Poodle Rockin'"
"She Lives on a Mountain"
"Drws" (James)
"Over & Out" (E. Childs, James)
"Don't You Worry" (M. Childs)
"Faraway Eyes" (E. Childs, James)
"The Fool" (James)
"Hair Like Monkey Teeth Like Dog"
"Spanish Dance Troupe"
"Desolation Blues"
"Murder Ballad"
"Freckles"
"Christmas Eve"
"The Humming Song"

Personnel

Euros Childs - vocals, piano, organ
John Lawrence - guitar, vocals
Richard James - bass, guitar, vocals
Euros Rowlands - drums, percussion
Megan Childs - violin, vocals
Gorwel Owen - Piano
Edwyn Humphreis - Woodwind
Euros Wyn - Woodwind
Tony Robinson - Brass
Oscar Owen - Vocals
Alfreda Benge - Sleeve art

References

External links

Spanish Dance Troupe at YouTube (streamed copy where licensed)

1999 albums
Gorky's Zygotic Mynci albums
Albums produced by Gorwel Owen